The Royal Freshwater Bay Yacht Club is a yacht club situated in Freshwater Bay on the Swan River  in  Peppermint Grove, a suburb of Perth, Western Australia.

The club was founded in 1896 by a group of friends including Aubrey Sherwood and Edward Keane, whose residence is now the RFBYC clubhouse. It is the second yacht club in Perth to be granted the royal charter, and it has established a strong but friendly rivalry with the other royal club, Royal Perth Yacht Club.

Each year the fleets of the two Royal clubs race, with the prize 'The Governor's Cup' being presented by the Governor of Western Australia as the Queen's representative and patron of the royal clubs.

The club holds functions weekly in both the Athol Hobbs Room and Main Function and Dining Room, with a bar open 7 days of the week to members.

See also

List of International Council of Yacht Clubs members

Notes

External links
 

Royal yacht clubs
Yacht clubs in Western Australia
Swan River (Western Australia)
1896 establishments in Australia
Sports clubs established in 1896
Sporting clubs in Perth, Western Australia
Organisations based in Australia with royal patronage